Clerkenwater is a hamlet in the parish of Helland, Cornwall, England.

References

Hamlets in Cornwall